Derek Martin Hamilton (born 26 August 1958) is a Scottish former football player, known for playing for St Mirren F.C.

Playing career

Derek Hamilton was born in Kilwinning in 1958. He joined Aberdeen from junior club Beith Juniors in 1978 and spent five years at Aberdeen. He joined St Mirren F.C. in 1983, where he spent six years and was part of the team which won the 1987 Scottish Cup Final. On leaving St Mirren in 1989, he had spells at Stranraer and Morton. He returned to Junior football with Irvine Meadow, and retired in 1991.

Honours

 Scottish Cup Winner: 1
 1986–87

Personal life

Hamilton has been living in Stewarton, Ayrshire since 2012.

References

External links

1958 births
Living people
People from Kilwinning
Scottish footballers
Aberdeen F.C. players
St Mirren F.C. players
Stranraer F.C. players
Greenock Morton F.C. players
Scottish Football League players
Association football fullbacks
Beith Juniors F.C. players
Irvine Meadow XI F.C. players
Footballers from North Ayrshire